Fleury Marius (May 17, 1896 – May 15, 1972) was a French aviator. He was born and raised in Lyon, and he was part of the 99th Infantry Regiment in World War I and was appointed commander of the Lyon Air Division in 1945, during World War II.

1896 births
1972 deaths
French Resistance members
French aviators
École de l'air alumni